Yehowists  (also Yehowist-Ilyinites, Ilyinists, Ilyintsy, Jehovists, Sect of the Right-hand Brotherhood, The Message of Zion) is a Russian Spiritual Christian millenarian religious movement founded by retired army officer and religious thinker Nikolai Ilyin in the 1840s.

Before the Revolution
During Ilyin's life and due to sending bulk booklets both by Ilyin and by his followers groups of Ilyinites were founded in different parts of the Russian Empire. The center of the movement before the Revolution remained in Ural but individual groups were also formed in Transcaucasia, Northern Caucasus and Ukraine. Ilyinites were persecuted periodically, and quite often they were punished by exiling to Central Asia and other parts of the Russian Empire. In the 19th and 20th centuries, Russians were populating parts of Kazakhstan and northern Kyrgyzstan. There were Yehowists among settlers who discovered that new places provide more religious freedom than they had in Russian regions.

During the Soviet period
Ilyinites took the revolution of 1917 indifferently. Their teaching prohibits them to take action in military clashes and killing, however Ilyinites expected to get more religious freedom after the revolution. In 1939 a secret center of Ilyinites was discovered and closed by NKVD in Nizhny Tagil city in Ural. During the Soviet period Ilyinites had to hide their activity; some of them were persecuted, arrested; their religious literature was confiscated. Quite often young men refused to serve in the army, which resulted in criminal prosecution and in some cases in capital punishment. Nevertheless, Yehowists kept on distributing Ilyin's booklets both printed secretly and hand-written or copied with a copying paper. Yehowists are not a registered organization believing that there is no need in getting registered with the authorities that belong to Satan. Religious publications about Yehowists made during the Soviet period are scarce and contain wrong data about Yehowists. They stated that Ilyinites ceased to exist as a religious movement and also tried to represent Yehowists as part or a branch of Jehovah's Witnesses, which is totally incorrect.

Today
The Yehowist Movement (frequently referred to by its members as Brotherhood) continues to exist in parts of the former Soviet Union, particularly in Kazakhstan, Kyrgyzstan, Southern Russia, and Ukraine. Most Yehowists are ethnic Russians, although the percentage of non-Russian members is growing due to conversion. The period is characterized by new forms of distribution of religious literature; in particular Ilyinites actively use the Internet translating Ilyin's works to other languages. Yehowists run a multilingual website - http://svetoch.org offering both Russian originals intended for the public at large and also English, German, Hebrew, Greek, Polish and Kyrgyz translations. Invitations to visit the site are posted periodically on forums and other sites in the Russian segment of the Internet.

The Yehowist population is small and there are no accurate estimates to the number of Yehowists because it is a closed religious organization. Ilyinites never provide any information about their population and also about internal life and activity of their communities. Their population is believed to grow due to proselytism.

Theology
Ilyin's teaching in today's representation is a quite sophisticated and philosophical concept, which focuses on such aspects as the 1,000-year kingdom, the physical immortality of man, and the upcoming battle between Yehowah and Satan in Armageddon. Despite the fact that Ilying was a proponent of polytheism, he focused on two Gods only: Yehowah and Satan. According to Ilyin there are two "ManGods" of equal strength in our Solar system - Yehowah and Satan. There are other Gods outside the Earth and the Solar system but they are not empowered to deal with earthly people and people must not worship them. Speaking about Yehowah Ilying said: "...THE ONLY GOD over people, and HE is the only ONE, who has keys to death and graves... and HE is the only ONE, whom we should worship and pray about everything..." Gods like people exist in human form. Yehowism totally denies existence of a soul, paradise and hell in their modern interpretation. For this reason Yehowah is often called a mangod in Ilyin's works. According to Ilyin: "Yehowah is a man and even a Hebrew but the EVERLASTING ONE..." Yehowah is God of the immortals while Satan is God of the mortals or satanists, meaning the followers of traditional Christian denominations and Talmudic Judaism. Ilyin wrote: "my GOD walks on Earth, and visits HIS friends, and has supper with them, like HE visited Abraham and had supper with him under the oak tree, …visited Melchizedek, Job, Adam and Eve, Cain and Abel, Balaam and Mohammad." Some famous religious people of the past, according to Ilyin, were representatives of Yehowism in their time, for example John Huss, Quaker George Fox, a German mystic Jakob Böhme, Socrates, Pythagoras, Medichi, Elisabeth Kridner, Muhammad, Confucius and many others. Yehowah, according to Ilyin, is Jesus. Jesus Christ was a temporary incarnation of Yehowah on Earth. So it was the Hebrew God Yehowah himself who was crucified and died on the cross. Yehowists totally deny the Trinity, believing it to be Satan's fiction.

Yehowah and Satan lead an ongoing fight with each other. Yehowists fight for Yehowah by distributing Ilyin's works and following moral and ritual norms of Yehowism. In reward they will get eternal life in physical form. A decisive battle will soon take place between the two Gods, which Ilyin calls Armageddon. Yehowah will win and build a 1,000-year Jerusalem Republic. This will be a period of abundance for people. After 1,000 years, Satan will break free and the last battle with Yehowah will take place, in which Satan and his followers will be exterminated utterly. Then Yehowah will renew the Earth drastically and will keep on improving it periodically.

Ilyin never set any particular dates for Armageddon, foretelling forthcoming apocalyptic events rather than their dates: "[Satan] will force all people to bow to its vicious power and for cannon fodder causing a lot of suffering and bloodshed; especially it will kill brutally lot of people in the Turkish empire, Balkan Peninsula, Jerusalem and in the Caucasus," or in another booklet he says: "first, [i.e. before the tribulation] YEHOWAH will bring down cannon fire on Germany."

The goal of every person on this planet, according to Ilyin, is to achieve physical immortality through self-perfection, observing Yehowah's Law and his last-days commands given through Ilyin.

Revered books
Yehowists believe that text of the Christian (and Jewish) Bible was distorted by Satan. Although they agree that the bible contains some truths but its text is so much distorted that Yehowists don't use it at all believing that the reader will not be able to tell the truth from later Satan's distortions and additions. Although Ilyin's works contain numerous references to the Bible but members of Yehowist society are not allowed to read it including Holy Scriptures of other religions. Instead Yehowists take Book of Revelation of Saint John edited by Ilyin and alternatively called by Yehowists the Book from Heaven as the holiest book. This book is considered secret and available to members of the Yehowist society only. Apart from the Book from Heaven Ilyin's works are also regarded as holy writings. They are divided into several types depending on creation period and purpose. Some books written by Ilyin are considered to be out of date intended mainly for members of the organization. Works written during the initial period are known to be materials for distribution, which are distributed with the aim of propagation of Ilyin's teaching. All works by Ilyin are reproduced by Yehowists both in printed and handwritten forms with the old Russian spelling kept in order to avoid distortions when reproducing them. Below you can find a list of booklets translated into English:

 Universal Truth
 Inviting all mortal people to become immortal
 Second address by Messenger of YEHOWAH
 Disproving all religions

Handing out booklets is the only allowed method of propagation of the teaching while verbal preaching is prohibited. Nikolai Ilyin prohibited his followers to preach verbally based on the prophecy in Is. 41-25 "...he will do it the way that no one will hear him preaching a sermon nor breaking a bruised reed in the street"; in addition, preaching may easily lead to debate with members of other religions. Preaching is also believed to have a possibility of distortions of the message. Booklets are handed out to all people who are willing to take them.

Worship and traditions
Worship of Yehowists take place during closed meetings and only members of the society can take part in them. The meetings are likely to include prayers, singing, reading Holy Scriptures and burning the incense. Yehowists use a book of hymns written by Ilyin for singing both at worship meetings and at also at informal meetings.

Worship meetings of Yehowists takes place on Saturdays starting from Friday night because Saturday is a day of rest like in Judaism. Unlike Judaism observing the Saturday is not so strict. Saturday is the only religious festivity of Yehowists. Celebration of Christmas, Easter and other traditional Christian religious celebrations is not allowed. Although Yehowists use common and personal celebrations like New Year and birthday for informal meetings.

Yehowists strictly follow a food diet, which in general is similar to the Jewish one. In particular eating pork, hare and other seafood is strictly forbidden.

Yehowists don't serve in the army and don't take part in military actions. As a whole the moral rules they preach are universal. They condemn hatred, unjustness, lie, slander, theft, alcohol, smoking and other vices.

Attitude to education
Yehowists value secular education. Ilyin repeatedly emphasized that his message, first of all, is intended for educated people. In reality the majority of Ilyinites don't hold academic degrees, which is caused mainly by persecution by the authorities and limited capabilities for getting education, especially in rural areas. There are no any restrictions for getting education including higher one excluding theological, legal, military and theatrical ones regarded by Ilyin as Satan's sciences.

Attitude to other religions

Yehowism claims to be the only true religion of God Yehowah. Consequently, other religions are considered to be false or deluded. Participation in worship and even visiting religious buildings of other religions is prohibited. Although Ilyin praised some religious leaders and followers of the past such as Quakers, Novgorod strigolniks and others, as a whole Ilyin criticized other religions in his writings, especially traditional Christian denominations and Talmudic Judaism.

Criticism

Yehowists are often criticized for expressing hatred and being intolerant of other religions. Indeed, a lot of sayings by Ilyin contain keen criticism towards them and are not ethically acceptable. However, despite severe criticism of other religions and ideologies Yehowism is friendly to people practicing them. Ilyin repeatedly called on his followers to get along with all people regardless of their beliefs and perception. Ilyin's style is characterized by a certain degree of rudeness and straightforwardness. This might easily astonish and even shock readers, who have never read similar ideas. Disrespect to the Bible, Christian sacred objects, mysteries, Talmud, etc. shown by Ilyin in his writings also might drive away and insult members of traditional religions.

References

External links
 Official Yehowist website

Christian denominations established in the 19th century
Christian denominations in Russia
Christian new religious movements
New religious movements
Nontrinitarian denominations
Seventh-day denominations
Spiritual Christianity